Dave Prosho (born 1965, Leicestershire) is an English actor. He studied drama at University of Winchester (then known as King Alfred's College) on the Drama, Theatre and Television Studies course, from 1983 to 1986.

Prosho is best known for his role as DC Ian Mitchell in Scott & Bailey. He has also appeared as Jimmy in The Syndicate, and in a number of other dramas, including Queer as Folk, Phoenix Nights, The Cops, The Second Coming, and The Vice.

He has also appeared in three Peter Kosminsky dramas: Walking on the Moon, Britz, and the BAFTA-winning The Government Inspector. Prosho has balanced his acting career with a career in education, between acting jobs, and is currently headteacher at Beechcliffe Special School in Thackley, Bradford.

Filmography

External links
 
 Hollyoaks cast profiles 
 Revolution Online

1965 births
English male television actors
Living people
Alumni of the University of Winchester